Flax fulturai is a moth of the family Erebidae first described by Michael Fibiger in 2011. It is found on Guadalcanal in the Solomon Islands.

The wingspan is about 10 mm. The labial palps, head, patagia, basal part of tegulae and thorax are black brown. The forewings (including fringes) are beige, with dark-brown subterminal and terminal areas. The base of costa and the medial area are also dark brown. There is a black dot in the inner lower area. The crosslines are beige. The terminal line is indicated by dark-brown interveinal dots. The hindwings are light grey. The underside of the forewings is unicolorous brown and the underside of the hindwings is grey with a discal spot.

References

Micronoctuini
Moths described in 2011
Taxa named by Michael Fibiger